The Mursi (or Mun as they refer to themselves)  are a Surmic ethnic group in Ethiopia. They principally reside in the Debub Omo Zone of the Southern Nations, Nationalities, and People's Region, close to the border with South Sudan. According to the 2007 national census, there are 11,500 Mursi, 848 of whom live in urban areas; of the total number, 92.25% live in the Southern Nations, Nationalities, and People's Region (SNNPR).

Surrounded by mountains between the Omo River and its tributary the Mago, the home of the Mursi is one of the most isolated regions of the country. Their neighbors include the Aari, the Banna, the Mekan, the Karo, the Kwegu, the Nyangatom and the Suri. They are grouped together with the Me'en and Suri by the Ethiopian government under the name Surma.

Language
The Mursi speak the Mursi language as a mother tongue.  It is a part of the Surmic language family. Mursi is closely related (over 80% cognate) to Me'en and Suri, as well as Kwegu. According to the 1994 national census, there were 3,163 people who were identified as Mursi in the SNNPR; 3,158 spoke Mursi as their first language, while 31 spoke it as their second language. According to the analytical volume of the 1994 national census, where Mursi was grouped under Me'en, 89.7% were monolingual, and the second languages spoken were Bench (4.2%), Amharic, which serves as one of the six official languages of Ethiopia. (3.5%), and Kafa (1.1%).

Two orthographies for the Mursi language exist. One is the Amharic-based, although the Mursi language is one of the Surmic languages with incompatible vowel structures and stressed and unstressed consonants compared to Amharic. The second is the more suitable Latin-based alphabet. The Latin-based orthography was developed by David Turton and Moges Yigezu of Addis Ababa University.

Religion and culture 

Like many agro-pastoralists in East Africa, the Mursi experience a force greater than themselves, which they call Tumwi.   This is usually located in the Sky, although sometimes Tumwi manifests itself as a thing of the sky (ahi a tumwin), such as a rainbow or a bird.  The principal religious and ritual office in the society is that of the Kômoru, the Priest or Shaman. This is an inherited office, unlike the more informal political role of the Jalaba.  The Kômoru embodies in his person the well-being of the group as a whole and acts as a means of communication between the community and the god (Tumwi), especially when it is threatened by such events as drought, crop pests and disease.  His role is characterized by the performance of public rituals to bring rain, to protect men, cattle and crops from disease, and to ward off threatened attacks from other tribes. Ideally, in order to preserve this link between the people and the Tumwi, the Kômoru should not leave Mursiland or even his local group (bhuran). One clan in particular, Komortê, is considered to be, par excellence, the priestly clan, but there are priestly families in two other clans, namely Garikuli and Bumai.

The religion of the Mursi people is classified as Animism, although some Mursi have adopted Christianity. There is a Serving in Mission Station in the northeastern corner of Mursiland, which provides education, basic medical care and instruction in Christianity.

Life cycles
The Mursi undergo various rites of passage, educational or disciplinary processes. Lip plates are a well known aspect of the Mursi and Surma, who are probably the last groups in Africa amongst whom it is still the norm for women to wear large pottery, wooden discs, or 'plates', in their lower lips. Girls' lips are pierced at the age of 15 or 16. Occasionally lip plates are worn to a dance by unmarried women, and increasingly they are worn to attract tourists in order to earn some extra money. Lip plates are known as dhebi a tugoin.
 
Ceremonial duelling (thagine), a form of ritualised male violence, is a highly valued and popular activity of Mursi men, especially unmarried men, and a key marker of Mursi identity.  Age sets are an important political feature, where men are formed into named "age sets" and pass through a number of "age grades" during the course of their lives; married women have the same age grade status as their husbands.

Omo National Park

The African Parks Foundation and government park officials are accused of coercing Mursi into giving up their land within the boundaries of the Omo National Park without compensation. The documents are being used to legalize the boundaries of the park, which African Parks has taken over.

A group called "Native Solutions to Conservation Refugees" says that the documents will make the Mursi 'illegal squatters' on their own land and that a similar fate is befalling the Suri, Dizi, Me'en, and Nyangatom, who also live within the park. After the African Parks Foundation took over Omo National Park, the Mursi feared that they would eventually be evicted from their land like the Guji-Oromo in Nechasar National Park. Due to mounting pressures from human rights activists, African Parks Foundation announced its plans to leave Omo National Park in 2007.
The Mursi have declared their territory a community conservation area as of July 2008 and have begun a community tourism project.

The Gibe III Dam and the Large-Scale Commercial Irrigation Scheme
The Gibe III hydroelectric dam, in the middle Basin of the Omo and completed in October 2015,   will greatly modify the flood regime upon which thousands of people in the lower basin depend for their livelihoods.  By regulating the river flows, and 'uplifting' the low flows during the dry season, it will also make possible the development of large-scale commercial irrigation schemes, although the latest report commissioned suggests that there is not enough water in the Omo River to irrigate the proposed area of plantations.  The most ambitious of these is already being implemented by the state-run Ethiopian Sugar Corporation on land either taken from the Omo National Park or currently occupied by the Bodi, Mursi, Nyangatom and Kara. If current plans are realised the lower Omo will become by far the largest irrigation complex in Ethiopia, at least doubling the total irrigated area in the country.

References

Further reading
 (2000) Pancorbo, Luis: "Los labios del río Omo" en "Tiempo de África", pp. 176–190. Laertes. Barcelona. 
 (2007) Silvester, Hans: Les Habits de la Nature Editions de la Martinière

External links

Mursi Online
People of Africa
The Mursi Language
National Geographic Photo Gallery
Mursi in danger of denial of access or displacement
An anthropologist's comments on the Mursi and the Omo Park situation (also available as a Word file)
African Parks Foundation
Mursi Online page on the Mursi 'Surmic' language (tugo)
Full-text documents and journal articles about the Mursi (Forced Migration Online, Digital Library)
https://www.youtube.com/watch?v=9PUSPE_7ek8&t=4s Walking With The Mursi is an adventure/travel documentary spanning four continents as David Willing hikes 500 km across Ethiopia's remote Omo Valley with Mursi tribes.

Ethnic groups in Ethiopia